Qaleh-ye Qadam (also Romanized as Qal‘eh-ye Qadam and Qal‘eh Qadam) is a village in Vanak Rural District, in the Central District of Semirom County, Isfahan Province, Iran. At the 2006 census, its population was 543, in 115 families.

References 

Populated places in Semirom County